Kevin Joseph Ahearn (born June 20, 1948) is a retired professional ice hockey player who played 78 games in the World Hockey Association with the New England Whalers in 1972–73. As an amateur, he played for the Boston College men's ice hockey as well as the US national team at the 1972 Winter Olympics and 1971 Ice Hockey World Championship tournament.

References 
 

1948 births
American men's ice hockey left wingers
Boston College Eagles men's ice hockey players
Ice hockey players from Massachusetts
Ice hockey players at the 1972 Winter Olympics
Jacksonville Barons players
Living people
Medalists at the 1972 Winter Olympics
Montreal Voyageurs players
New England Whalers players
Olympic silver medalists for the United States in ice hockey
People from Milton, Massachusetts